Danny Stanton (September 24, 1896 – May 5, 1943) was a Chicago mobster and labor union racketeer for the Chicago Outfit during Prohibition. An early leader of the Sheldon Gang, he later headed members of the Ragen's Colts on behalf of Al Capone in support of the Druggan-Lake Gang during the bootleg wars of the mid-1920s.

Biography 
Daniel Stanton Jr. was born September 24, 1896 to Daniel Sr., a first generation Irish-American immigrant from Ireland and Jane Hilton from Chicago, Illinois. He enlisted in the U.S. Army and earned the rank of a Private 1st Class during World War I where he saw action overseas before returning in July 1919, first living in New York City and then finally settling at 6222 South Carpenter Avenue in Englewood, Chicago. In control of the Chicago's South Side since the early-1920s, he and Red Fawcett (Forsyth) continued running criminal operations in the area during the 1930s as well as organizing municipal workers as part of the syndicate's plans to infiltrate city hall.  Becoming involved in an underworld dispute over illegal gambling operations, he was killed with his associate Louis Dorman on May 5, 1943.

Danny Stanton was married to Lucile Bock Stanton at the time of his death.

Further reading
Asbury, Herbert. The Gangs of Chicago: An Informal History of the Chicago Underworld. New York: Alfred A. Knoff, 1940. 
Binder, John. The Chicago Outfit. Arcadia Publishing, 2003. 
The Police Journal: A Review for Police Forces of the Empire. P. Allen & Co. ltd., 1963.
United States. Congress. Senate. Committee on Governmental Affairs. Permanent Subcommittee on Investigations. Hotel Employees & Restaurant Employees International Union: hearings before the Permanent Subcommittee on Investigations of the Committee on Governmental Affairs. 1984. 
United States. Congress. Senate. Special Committee to Investigate Organized Crime in Interstate Commerce. Investigation of Organized Crime in Interstate Commerce: Hearings Before a Special Committee to Investigate Organized Crime in Interstate Commerce. 1951. 

1943 deaths
American gangsters
Murdered American gangsters of Irish descent
Chicago Outfit mobsters
People murdered in Illinois
Male murder victims
1896 births
United States Army personnel of World War I